The Brandenburgischer Landespokal, known as the Krombacher Pokal Brandenburg for sponsorship reasons, is an annual football cup competition, held by the . It is one of the 21 regional cup competitions in Germany.

The record winners of the competition are SV Babelsberg 03, with nine titles to their name (including one won by their reserve team, SV Babelsberg 03 II).

Final results

External links
FLB – Brandenburg Football Association 

Football cup competitions in Germany
Football competitions in Brandenburg
Recurring sporting events established in 1991
1991 establishments in Germany